Southern Railway headquarters administrative building, Chennai, is an Indo-Saracenic structure located adjacent to the  on Poonamallee High Road.

History

Built in 1921 as the new Madras and Southern Mahratta Railway Company (MSMR) headquarters (successor of Madras Railway Company), replacing the general office of MSMR at Royapuram Railway Station, the building now functions as the headquarters of the Southern Railways. The building was built at a cost of  2 million by T. Samynada Pillai, a leading Bangalore-based contractor, who was given the contract upon the successful completion of the Egmore Railway Station. Built for the first time in India in reinforced concrete in classical and Dravidian styles, the building was designed by N. Grayson, a 'company architect', working for the Madras & Southern Mahratta Railway. It took nine years and over  3 million to complete the building and was inaugurated on 11 December 1922.

The building
The central bay has two rectangular wings, both of which are arranged around a lush courtyard. The structure was built with large windows to allow the sea breeze to waft through, reaching the courtyard from the front and then going out through the opposite wing.

See also
 Heritage structures in Chennai
 Architecture of Chennai

References

External links

 Southern Railway official website
 Southern Railway

Southern Railway zone
Office buildings in Chennai
Transport in Chennai
Heritage sites in Chennai
Railway buildings and structures
Headquarters in India